Philip Trevor Spalding (19 November 1957 – 5 February 2023) was an English bass player. He was best known as a session musician and player of Fender Precision Bass guitars. He played and appeared with performing artists such as Mike Oldfield, Mick Jagger, Seal, Orchestral Manoeuvres in the Dark, Elton John and Randy Crawford.

At an early age he was a successful child model and appeared in a television advertisement for Smiths Crisps. Spalding was a computer operator for a high street bank, before joining rock  artist Bernie Tormé in 1976. Later he joined Original Mirrors before beginning a collaboration with Toyah, in December 1980. Whilst with The Toyah band he recorded and co-wrote songs for studio albums and toured with the band, until 1983. Later he was a member of GTR and Mike Oldfield's band. He later appeared on albums by Michel Polnareff, Suggs, Robbie Williams and Kylie Minogue.

Spalding also recorded all bass tracks on The Lion King soundtrack studio album.

As someone formerly affected by hepatitis C, he appeared on BBC Oxford on 28 July 2008 to promote a vaccine trial for the disease. Spalding started a patient support group called Hep C Positive in Swindon, and worked with the charity Liver4Life to raise awareness of hepatitis C.

In February 2012 he joined the Simon Townshend band for the 'Secret Weapon' UK tour in support of the album Looking Out, Looking In. Spalding played bass with The Who at their promotional acoustic concerts at Pryzm in Kingston, London on 12 February 2020.

Spalding was a Freemason and was a member of Westminster City School Lodge no. 4305. He died in February 2023, at the age of 65.

Discography

With Max Bacon
 The Higher You Climb (1995)
 From the Banks of the River Irwell (2022)

With Melanie C
 Reason (2003)

With Roger Chapman
 Hybrid and Lowdown (1990)

With Ray Charles
 Strong Love Affair (1996)

With Joe Cocker
 Across from Midnight (1997)

With Randy Crawford
 Play Mode (2000)

With Marcella Detroit
 Jewel (1994)

With Julia Downes
 Let Sleeping Dogs Lie (1983)

With Terence Trent D'Arby
 Introducing the Hardline According to Terence Trent D'Arby (1987)

With Delta Goodrem
 Mistaken Identity (2004)

With GTR
 GTR (1986)
 King Biscuit Flower Hour Presents GTR (1997)

With Geri Halliwell
 Passion (2005)

With Mick Jagger
 Goddess in the Doorway (2001)

With Elton John
 Duets (1993)

With Beverley Knight
 Affirmation (2004)

With Nick Lachey
 SoulO (2003)

With Kylie Minogue
 Light Years (2000)

With Michel Polnareff
 Kāma-Sūtra (1990)

With Skin
 Fleshwounds (2003)

With Matthew Sweet
 Inside (1986)

With Roger Taylor
 Happiness? (1994)

With Judie Tzuke
 Under the Angels (1996)

With Robbie Williams
 Sing When You're Winning (2000)
 Escapology (2002)

Notes

References
 Toyah-The Changeling tour programme (1982).
Hepatitis "C" Vaccine Trials. BBC TV. 28 July 2008

External Links
 
 

1957 births
2023 deaths
English rock bass guitarists
Male bass guitarists
Musicians from London
English session musicians
Toyah (band) members
GTR (band) members
English Freemasons